Andrea Hlaváčková and Lucie Hradecká were the defending champions, but decided not to participate.

Cara Black and Anastasia Rodionova won the title, defeating Julia Görges and Yaroslava Shvedova in the final, 2–6, 6–2, [10–5].

Seeds

Draw

References 
 Draw

ASB Classic
2013 Doubles